Yazykovo is a rural locality (a selo) and the administrative center of Blagovarsky District of the Republic of Bashkortostan, Russia. Population:

References

Notes

Sources

Rural localities in Blagovarsky District
Ufa Governorate